My Romance may refer to:

"My Romance" (song), a 1935 song written by Richard Rodgers and Lorenz Hart
My Romance (Carly Simon album), 1990
My Romance (Chris Anderson album), 1983
My Romance (Houston Person album), 1998